The Lepidoptera of Hispaniola consist of both the butterflies and moths recorded from the island of Hispaniola, comprising the two sovereign nations of Haiti and the Dominican Republic.

According to a recent estimate, there are about of 1,180 Lepidoptera species present on the island.

Butterflies (Papilionoidea)

Papilionidae

Papilioninae

Leptocircini
Protographium zonaria (Butler, 1869)

Papilionini
Heraclides androgeus epidaurus (Godman & Salvin, 1890)
Heraclides aristodemus aristodemus (Esper, 1794)
Heraclides aristor (Godart, 1819)
Heraclides machaonides (Esper, 1796)
Heraclides pelaus imerius (Godart, 1824)
Papilio demoleus Linnaeus, 1758

Troidini
Battus polydamas polycrates (Hopffer, 1865)
Battus zetides (Munroe, 1971)

Hesperiidae

Hesperiinae
Argon sp.
Atalopedes mesogramma apa Comstock, 1944
Calpodes ethlius (Stoll, 1782)
Choranthus haitensis Skinner, 1920
Choranthus maria Minno, 1990
Choranthus melissa Gali, 1983
Choranthus schwartzi Gali, 1983
Copaeodes stillmani (Bell & Comstock, 1948)
Cymaenes tripunctus (Herrich-Schäffer, 1865)
Euphyes singularis insolata (Butler, 1878)
Hesperia nabokovi (Bell & Comstock, 1948)
Hylephila phyleus (Drury, 1773)
Nyctelius nyctelius nyctelius (Latreille, 1824)
Ochlodes batesi (Bell, 1935)
Panoquina ocola distipuncta Johnson & Matusik, 1988
Perichares philetes philetes (Gmelin, 1790)
Polites baracoa loma Evans, 1955
Pyrrhocalles antiqua antiqua (Herrich-Schäffer, 1863)
Rhinton bushi Watson, 1937
Synapte malitiosa adoceta Schwartz & Sommer, 1986
Wallengrenia otho druryi (Latreille, 1824)

Pyrginae

Eudamini
Aguna asander haitensis (Mabille & Boullet, 1912)
Astraptes anaphus anausis (Goodman & Salvin, 1896)
Astraptes alardus heriul (Mabille & Boullet, 1912)
Astraptes talus (Cramer, 1777)
Astraptes xagua christyi (Sharpe, 1898)
Cabares potrillo (Lucas, 1857)
Chioides ixion (Plötz, 1880)
Epargyreus spanna Evans, 1952
Phocides pigmalion bicolor (Boddaert, 1783)
Polygonus leo leo (Gmelin, 1790)
Polythrix octomaculata (Ménétriés, 1855)
Proteides mercurius sanchesi Bell & Comstock, 1948
Urbanus dorantes cramptoni Comstock, 1944
Urbanus proteus domingo (Scudder, 1872)

Pyrgini
Achlyodes mithridates sagra Evans, 1953
Anastrus sempiternus dilloni (Bell & Comstock, 1948)
Burca hispaniolae Bell & Comstock, 1948
Burca stillmani Bell & Comstock, 1948
Ephyriades zephodes (Hübner, 1825)
Erynnis zarucco (Lucas, 1857)
Gesta gesta (Herrich-Schäffer, 1863)
Pyrgus crisia Herrich-Schäffer, 1865
Pyrgus oileus (Linnaeus, 1767)

Pieridae

Coliadinae
Abaeis nicippe (Cramer, 1782)
Abaeis nicippiformis (Munroe, 1947)
Anteos clorinde (Godart, 1824)
Anteos maerula (Fabricius, 1775)
Aphrissa godartiana godartiana (Swainson, 1821)
Aphrissa orbis browni (Munroe, 1947)
Aphrissa statira hispaniolae (Munroe, 1947)
Eurema daira palmira (Poey, 1852)
Eurema elathea elathea (Cramer, 1777)
Eurema priddyi priddyi (Lathy, 1898)
Eurema nise larae (Herrich-Schäffer, 1862)
Kricogonia lyside (Godart, 1819)
Nathalis iole Boisduval, 1836
Phoebis agarithe antillia Brown, 1929
Phoebis argante rorata (Butler, 1869)
Phoebis editha (Butler, 1870)
Phoebis philea thalestris (Illiger, 1801)
Phoebis sennae sennae (Linnaeus, 1758)
Pyrisitia dina mayobanex (Bates, 1939)
Pyrisitia euterpiformis (Munroe, 1947)
Pyrisitia leuce memulus (Butler, 1871)
Pyrisitia lisa euterpe (Ménétriés, 1832)
Pyrisitia proterpia (Fabricius, 1775)
Pyrisitia pyro (Godart, 1819)
Rhabdodryas trite watsoni (Brown, 1929)
Zerene cesonia cynops (Butler, 1873)

Dismorphiinae
Dismorphia spio (Godart, 1819)

Pierinae

Pierini

Ascia monuste eubotea (Godart, 1819)
Ganyra josephina josephina (Godart, 1819)
Glutophrissa drusilla boydi (Comstock, 1943)
Glutophrissa punctifera (d'Almeida, 1939)
Melete salacia salacia (Godart, 1819)

Lycaenidae

Polyommatinae
Brephidium exilis isophthalma (Herrich-Schäffer, 1862)
Cyclargus ammon noeli (Comstock & Huntington, 1943)
Cyclargus kathleena Johnson & Matusik, 1992
Cyclargus sorpresus Johnson & Matusik, 1992
Hemiargus hanno ceraunus (Fabricius, 1793)
Leptotes cassius theonus (Lucas, 1857)
Leptotes perkinsae idealus Johnson & Matusik, 1988
Pseudochrysops bornoi bornoi (Comstock & Huntington, 1943)

Theclinae

Eumaeini
Allosmaitia coelebs (Herrich-Schäffer, 1862)
Chlorostrymon maesites (Herrich-Schäffer, 1862)
Chlorostrymon simaethis (Drury, 1773)
Electrostrymon angelia (Hewitson, 1874)
Electrostrymon minikyanos Johnson & Matusik, 1988
Ministrymon azia (Hewitson, 1873)
Nesiostrymon celida (Lucas, 1857)
Rekoa bourkei (Kaye, 1924)
Strymon acis (Drury, 1773)
Strymon bazochii (Godart, 1824)
Strymon christophei (Comstock & Huntington, 1943)
Strymon columella (Fabricius, 1793)
Strymon limenia (Hewitson, 1868)
Strymon monopeteinus Schwartz & J. Y. Miller, 1985
Strymon toussainti (Comstock & Huntington, 1943)

Riodinidae
†Theope sp. (DeVries & Poinar, 1997 [Dominican amber])
†Voltinia dramba Robbins & Harvey in Hall et al., 2004 [Dominican amber]

Nymphalidae

Apaturinae
Asterocampa idyja idyja (Geyer, 1828)
Doxocopa thoe (Godart, 1824)

Biblidinae

Cyrestini
Marpesia chiron chiron (Fabricius, 1775)
Marpesia eleuchea dospassosi Munroe, 1971

Biblidini
Archimestra teleboas (Ménétriés, 1832)
Biblis hyperia (Cramer, 1779)
Eunica monima (Cramer, 1782)
Eunica tatila tatilista Kaye, 1926
Hamadryas amphichloe diasia (Fruhstorfer, 1916)
Lucinia cadma torrebia (Ménétriés, 1832)
Myscelia aracynthia (Dalman, 1823)

Dynaminini
†Dynamine alexae Peñalver & Grimaldi, 2006 [Dominican amber]
Dynamine serina zetes (Ménétriés, 1832)

Charaxinae

Anaeini
Anaea troglodyta (Fabricius, 1775)
Fountainea johnsoni (Avinoff & Shoumatoff, 1941)
Memphis verticordia (Hübner, 1831)
Siderone galanthis nemesis (Illiger, 1801)

Preponini
Archaeoprepona demophoon insulicola (Godart, 1823)

Danainae

Euploeini
Anetia briarea briarea (Godart, 1819)
Anetia jaegeri (Ménétriés, 1832)
Anetia pantheratus pantheratus (Martyn, 1797)
Lycorea halia cleobaea (Godart, 1819)
Lycorea halia halia (Hübner, 1816)

Danaini
Danaus cleophile (Godart, 1819)
Danaus eresimus tethys Forbes, 1944
Danaus gilippus cleothera (Godart, 1819)
Danaus plexippus megalippe (Hübner, 1826)

Heliconiinae

Argynnini
Euptoieta claudia claudia (Cramer, 1779)
Euptoieta hegesia hegesia (Cramer, 1779)

Heliconiini
Agraulis vanillae insularis Maynard, 1889
Dryas iulia fucatus (Boddaert, 1783)
Eueides isabella melphis (Godart, 1819)
Heliconius charitonia churchi Comstock & Brown, 1950

Ithomiinae

Godyridini
Greta diaphanus quisqueya (Fox, 1963)

Libytheinae
Libytheana terena (Godart, 1819)

Limenitidinae
Adelpha fessonia lapitha Hall, 1929
Adelpha gelania gelania (Godart, 1824)

Nymphalinae

Coeini
Colobura dirce wolcotti (Comstock, 1942)
Historis acheronta semele (Bates, 1939)
Historis odius odius (Fabricius, 1775)

Kallimini
Anartia jatrophae saturata Staudinger, 1884
Anartia lytrea (Godart, 1819)
Hypolimnas misippus (Linnaeus, 1764)
Junonia evarete (Cramer, 1779)
Junonia genoveva (Cramer, 1780)
Siproeta stelenes stelenes (Linnaeus, 1758)

Nymphalini
Hypanartia paullus (Fabricius, 1793)
Vanessa atalanta rubria (Fruhstorfer, 1909)
Vanessa cardui (Linnaeus, 1758)
Vanessa virginiensis (Drury, 1773)

Melitaeini
Antillea pelops pelops (Drury, 1773)
Anthanassa frisia (Poey, 1832)
Atlantea cryptadia Sommer & Schwartz, 1980

Satyrinae

Satyrini
Calisto ainigma Johnson, Quinter & Matusik, 1987
Calisto aleucosticha Correa & Schwartz, 1986
Calisto amazona Gonzalez, 1987:6. Schwartz, 1989
Calisto arcas Bates, 1939:48. Schwartz, 1989
Calisto archebates (Ménétriés, 1832)
Calisto batesi Clench, 1943
Calisto chrysaoros Bates, 1935
Calisto clenchi Schwartz & Gali, 1984
Calisto clydoniata Schwartz & Gali, 1984
Calisto confusa Lathy, 1899
Calisto crypta Gali, 1985
Calisto dystacta Gonzalez, 1987
Calisto eleleus Bates, 1935
Calisto franciscoi Gali, 1985
Calisto galii choneupsilon Schwartz, 1985
Calisto galii galii Schwartz, 1983
Calisto gonzalezi Schwartz, 1988
Calisto grannus dilemma Gonzalez, 1987
Calisto grannus grannus Bates, 1939
Calisto hysius (Godart, 1819)
Calisto loxias Bates, 1935
Calisto lyceius Bates, 1935
Calisto micheneri Clench, 1944
Calisto micrommata Schwartz & Gali, 1984
Calisto montana Clench, 1943
Calisto neiba Schwartz & Gali, 1984
Calisto neochma Schwartz, 1991
Calisto obscura Michener, 1943
Calisto pauli Johnson & Hedges, 1998
Calisto phoinix Gonzalez, 1987
Calisto pulchella darlingtoni Clench, 1943
Calisto pulchella pulchella Lathy, 1899
Calisto raburni Gali, 1985
Calisto schwartzi Gali, 1985
Calisto sommeri Schwartz & Gali, 1984
Calisto tasajera Gonzalez et al., 1991
Calisto thomasi Johnson & Hedges, 1998
Calisto tragius Bates, 1935
Calisto wetherbeei Schwartz & Gonzalez, 1988
Calisto woodsi Johnson & Hedges, 1998

Moths

Nepticuloidea

Opostegidae
Pseudopostega venticola (Walsingham, 1897)

Incurvarioidea

Heliozelidae
Heliozela ahenea Walsingham, 1897

Carposinoidea

Carposinidae
Carposina bullata Meyrick, 1913

Tineoidea

Acrolophidae
Acrolophus arcasalis (Walker, 1858)
Acrolophus australis (Walsingham, 1897)
Acrolophus indecora (Walker, 1863)
Acrolophus occultum (Walsingham, 1897)
†Acrolophus sp. (Grimaldi & Engel, 2005) [Dominican amber]
Acrolophus umbratipalpis (Walsingham, 1891)

Tineidae
Lepyrotica fragilella (Walsingham, 1897)
Opogona simplex (Walsingham, 1897)
Protodarcia tischeriella (Walsingham, 1897)
Tinea cretella Walsingham, 1897
Tinea familiaris Zeller, 1877

Psychidae

Oiketicinae
Oiketicus kirbyi Guilding, 1827

Penestoglossinae
Pterogyne insularis Davis, 1975

Psychinae
Cryptothelea watsoni (F. M. Jones, 1923)
Lumacra haitiensis Davis, 1964
Paucivena hispaniolae Davis, 1975
Thyridopteryx ephemeraeformis (Haworth, 1803)

Gracillariidae

Gracillariinae
Acrocercops undifraga Meyrick, 1931
Dialectica permixtella Walsingham, 1897
Dialectica sanctaecrucis Walsingham, 1897
Eucosmophora dives Walsingham, 1897
Parectopa pulverella (Walsingham, 1897)
Parectopa undosa (Walsingham, 1897)

Phyllocnistinae
Phyllocnistis citrella Stainton, 1856

Urodoidea

Urodidae
Urodus mirella (Möschler, 1890)

Gelechioidea

Oecophoridae

Depressariinae
Gonionota rosacea (Forbes, 1931)

Ethmiinae
Ethmia abraxasella abraxasella (Walker, 1864)
Ethmia confusella (Walker, 1863)
Ethmia kirbyi (Möschler, 1890)
Ethmia nivosella (Walker, 1864)
Ethmia notatella (Walker, 1863)
Ethmia paucella (Walker, 1863)

Stenomatinae
Cerconota anonella (Sepp, 1852)

Gelechiidae

Anacampsinae
Pectinophora gossypiella (Saunders, 1844)
Sitotroga cerealella (Olivier, 1789)

Dichomerinae
Cymotricha melissia (Walsingham, 1911)
Dichomeris sp.

Gelechiinae
Aristotelia penicillata (Walsingham, 1897)
Aristotelia pudibundella (Zeller, 1873)
Aristotelia trossulella Walsingham, 1897
Keiferia lycopersicella (Walsingham, 1897)
Phthorimea operculella (Zeller, 1873)
Recurvaria kittella (Walsingham, 1897)
Stegasta capitella (Fabricius, 1794)
Telphusa perspicua (Walsingham, 1897)
Thiotricha godmani (Walsingham, 1892)
Tildenia gudmannella (Walsingham, 1897)

Choreutidae

Choreutinae
Hemerophila biferana Walker, 1863
Tortyra auriferalis Walker, 1863

Bratrachedridae

Bratrachedinae
Homaledra sabalella (Chambers, 1880)

Agonoxenidae
Pammeces lithochroma Walsingham, 1897
Pammeces picticornis (Walsingham, 1897)

Cosmopterigidae

Cosmopteriginae
†?Anoncia sp. (Poinar & Poinar, 1999) [Dominican amber]
Cosmopteryx abnormalis Walsingham, 1897
Cosmopterix attenuatella (Walker, 1864)
Pyroderces rileyi (Walsingham, 1882)
†?Pyroderces sp. (Poinar & Poinar, 1999) [Dominican amber]

Yponomeutoidea

Heliodinidae
Embola melanotela Hsu in Hsu & Powell, 2005

Plutellidae
Plutella xylostella (Linnaeus, 1758)

Yponomeutidae

Attevinae
Atteva siderea (Walsingham, 1891)

Lyonetiidae

Bucculatriginae
Perileucoptera coffeella (Guérin-Méneville, 1842)

Cemiostominae
Bucculatrix thurberiella (Busck, 1914)

Hyblaeoidea

Hyblaeidae
Hyblaea puera (Cramer, 1777)

Pyraloidea

Thyrididae

Striglininae
Banisia furva illicta Whalley, 1976

Crambidae

Acentropinae
Chrysendeton claudialis (Walker, 1859)
Petrophila gratalis (Walker, 1865)
Petrophila insulalis (Walker, 1862)
Petrophila malcusalis (Schaus, 1924)

Crambinae
Diatraea crambidoides (Grote, 1880)
Diatraea saccharalis (Fabricius, 1794)
Fissicrambus fissiradiellus (Walker, 1863)
Fissicrambus haytiellus (Zincken, 1821)
Mesolia plurimella (Walker, 1863)
Microcrambus discludellus (Möschler, 1890)
Microcrambus francescellus (Schaus, 1922)
Microcrambus podalirius Błeszyński, 1967
Prionapteryx eugraphis (Walker, 1863)

Evergestinae
Trischistognatha pyrenealis (Walker, 1859)

Glaphyriinae
Alatuncusia canalis (Walker, 1866)
Dichogama decoralis (Walker, 1865)
Hellula phidilealis (Walker, 1859)
Hellula rogatalis (Hulst, 1886)

Odontiinae
Cliniodes nacrealis Munroe, 1964
Mimoschinia rufofascialis (Stephens, 1834)

Pyraustinae
Achyra bifidalis (Fabricius, 1794)
Achyra rantalis (Guenée, 1854)
Agathodes designalis Guenée, 1854
Apogeshna acestealis (Walker, 1859)
Arthromastix lauralis Walker, 1859
Asciodes gordialis Guenée, 1854
Azochis rufidiscalis Hampson, 1904
Bicilia iarchasalis (Walker, 1859)
Bocchoropsis pharaxalis Walker, 1859
Ceratoclasis delimitalis (Guenée, 1854)
Conchylodes diphteralis (Geyer, 1832)
Conchylodes hebraealis Guenée, 1854
Conchylodes hedonialis (Walker, 1859)
Cyclocena lelex (Cramer, 1777)
Desmia funeralis (Hübner, 1796)
Desmia niveiciliata E. Hering, 1906
Desmia ploralis (Guenée, 1854)
Desmia ufeus (Cramer, 1777)
Diacme adipaloides (Grote & Robinson, 1867)
Diaphania antillia Munroe, 1960
Diaphania busccalis (Schaus, 1920)
Diaphania costata (Fabricius, 1794)
Diaphania elegans (Möschler, 1890)
Diaphania glauculalis (Guenée, 1854)
Diaphania hyalinata (Linnaeus, 1767)
Diaphania indica (Saunders, 1851)
Diaphania lualis (Herrich-Schäffer, 1871)
Diaphania nitidalis (Cramer, 1781)
Diaphania quadristigmalis (Guenée, 1854)
Diaphantania candacalis (Felder & Rogenhofer, 1875)
Diaphantania ceresalis (Walker, 1859)
Epicorsia oedipodalis (Guenée, 1854)
Ercta vittata (Fabricius, 1794)
Eulepte gastralis (Guenée, 1854)
Glyphodes sibillalis sibillalis Walker, 1859
Helvibotys carnifex (Felder & Rogenhofer, 1875)
Helvibotys panopealis (Walker, 1859)
Herpetogramma agavealis (Walker, 1859)
Herpetogramma antillalis (Schaus, 1920)
Herpetogramma bipunctalis (Fabricius, 1794)
Herpetogramma phaeopteralis (Guenée, 1854)
Hileithia magualis (Guenée, 1854)
Hymenia perspectalis (Hübner, 1796)
Lamprosema pelealis (Walker, 1859)
Lygropia imparalis (Walker, 1865)
Lygropia tripunctata (Fabricius, 1794)
Mabra russoi Schaus in Russo, 1940
Marasmia cochrusalis (Walker, 1859)
Marasmia trapezalis (Guenée, 1854)
Maruca testulalis (Geyer, 1832)
Maruca vitrata (Fabricius, 1787)
Microthyris anormalis (Guenée, 1854)
Neoleucinodes imperialis (Guenée, 1854)
Nomophila nearctica Munroe, 1973
Omiodes humeralis Guenée, 1854
Omiodes indicata (Fabricius, 1775)
Omiodes simialis Guenée, 1854
Ommatospila descriptalis (Walker, 1865)
Ommatospila narcaeusalis (Walker, 1859)
Palpita flegia (Cramer, 1777)
Palpita quadistrigmalis (Guenée, 1854)
Palpita kimballi Munroe, 1959
Palpita viettei Munroe, 1959
Pantographa prorogata (Hampson, 1912)
Phaedropsis domingalis (Schaus, 1920)
Phaedropsis hecalialis (Walker, 1859)
Phaedropsis stictigramma (Hampson, 1912)
Pilemia periusalis (Walker, 1859)
Pleuroptya silicalis (Guenée, 1854)
Polygrammodes elevata (Fabricius, 1794)
Proleucinodes impuralis (Felder & Rogenhofer, 1875)
Psara dryalis (Walker, 1859)
Pyrausta carnifex (Felder, 1860)
Pyrausta tyralis (Guenée, 1854)
Salbia haemorrhoidalis Guenée, 1854
Samea multiplicalis (Guenée, 1854)
Sathria internitalis (Guenée, 1854)
Spoladea recurvalis (Fabricius, 1775)
Syllepte opalisans (Felder & Rogenhofer, 1875)
Syngamia sp.
Synclera jarbusalis (Walker, 1859)
Terastia meticulosalis Guenée, 1854
Tomopteryx pterophoralis (Walker, 1865)
Udea secernalis (Möschler, 1890)

Schoenobiinae
Carectocultus perstrialis (Hübner, 1825)

Pyralidae

Chrysauginae
Bonchis munitalis (Lederer, 1863)
Carcha hersilialis Walker, 1859
Murgisca cervinalis Walker, 1863
Parachmidia fervidalis (Walker, 1865)

Epipaschiinae
Deuterolita ragonoti (Möschler, 1890)
Jocara fragilis Walker, 1863
Macalla thyrsisalis Walker, 1859

Galleriinae
Corcyra cephalonica (Stainton, 1865)
Galleria mellonella (Linnaeus, 1758)

Phycitinae
Amegarthria cervicalis (Dyar, 1919)
Amyelois transitella (Walker, 1863)
Anabasis ochrodesma (Zeller, 1881)
Anadelosemia texanella (Hulst, 1892)
Ancylostomia stercorea (Zeller, 1848)
Anegcephalesis arctella (Ragonot, 1893)
Anypsipyla univitella Dyar, 1914
Aptunga culmenicola Neunzig, 1996
Aptunga setadebilia Neunzig, 1996
Aptunga vega Neunzig, 1996
Australephestiodes stictella Hampson, 1901
Bema neuricella (Zeller, 1848)
Cactoblastis cactorum (Berg, 1885)
Caristanius pellucidellus (Ragonot, 1888)
Caristanius tripartitus Neunzig, 1996
Caudellia pilosa Neunzig, 1996
Chararica circiimperfecta Neunzig, 1996
Coptarthria dasypyga (Zeller, 1881)
Crocidomera fissuralis (Walker, 1863)
Crocidomera imitata Neunzig, 1990
Cryptobables sp.
Dasypyga independencia Neunzig, 1996
Davara caricae (Dyar, 1913)
Davara interjecta Heinrich, 1956
Davara rufulella (Ragonot, 1888)
Dioryctria amatella (Hulst, 1887)
Dioryctria dominguensis Neunzig, 1996
Dioryctria postmajorella Neunzig, 1996
Ectomyelois decolor (Zeller, 1881)
Ectomyelois muriscis (Dyar, 1914)
Elasmopalpus lignosellus (Zeller, 1848)
Ephestia cautella (Walker, 1883)
Ephestia elutella (Hübner, 1796)
Ephestia kuhniella Zeller, 1879
Erelieva quantulella (Hulst, 1887)
Etiella zinckenella (Treitschke, 1832)
Fundella argentina Dyar, 1919
Fundella ignobilis Heinrich, 1945
Fundella pelluscens Zeller, 1848
Hemiptiloceroides deltus Neunzig & Dow, 1993
Homeosoma electella (Hulst, 1887)
Hypargyria slosonella (Hulst, 1900)
Hypochalcia cervinistrigalis Walker, 1863
Hypsipyla grandella (Zeller, 1848)
Lascelina pedernalensis Neunzig, 1996
Lipographis subosseella Hulst, 1892
Moodna antilleana Neunzig, 1996
Moodnopsis portoricensis Heinrich, 1956
Nefundella munroei Neunzig, 2003
Olyca phryganoides Walker, 1857
Oncolabis anticella Zeller, 1848
Oryctometopia fossulatella Ragonot, 1888
Ozamia lucidalis (Walker, 1863)
Ozamia plagata Neunzig, 1996
Peadus burdettellus (Schaus, 1913)
Phycitodes olivaceella (Ragonot, 1888)
Plodia interpunctella (Hübner, 1813)
Salebria infusella (Zeller, 1848)
Stylopalpia lunigerella Hampson, 1901
Ufa rubedinella (Zeller, 1848)
Varneria albiornatella Neunzig, 1996
Zamagiria laidion (Zeller, 1881)
Zamagiria rawlinsi Neunzig, 1996

Pyralinae
Pseudasopia intermedialis (Walker, 1862)
Pyralis manihotalis Guenée, 1854

Pterophoroidea

Pterophoridae
Adaina thomae (Zeller, 1877)
Exelastis montischristi (Walsingham, 1897)
Leioptilus agraphodactylus (Walker, 1864)
Leioptilus inquinatus (Zeller, 1893)
Oidaematophorus ossipellis (Walsingham, 1897)

Cossoidea

Cossidae

Zeuzerinae
Psychonoctua personalis Grote, 1866

Epipyropidae
Fulgoraecia cucullata (Heinrich, 1931)

Limacodidae
Heuretes daidaleos Epstein & Miller, 1990
Heuretes divisus Epstein & Miller, 1990

Castnioidea

Castniidae

Castniinae
Ircila hecate (Herrich-Schäffer, 1854)

Tortricoidea

Tortricidae

Chlidanotinae
Ardeutica melidora Razowski, 1984
Ardeutica sphenobathra (Meyrick, 1917)
Polyortha naevifera Razowski, 1984
Polyortha nigriguttata Walsingham, 1914
†Polyvena horatis Poinar & Brown, 1993 [Dominican amber]

Olethreutinae
Bactra philocherda Diakonoff, 1964
Caccocharis cymotoma (Meyrick, 1917)
Crocidosema longipalpana (Möschler, 1891)
Crocidosema plebejana Zeller, 1847
Cryptaspasma bipenicilla J. Brown & R. Brown, 2004
Cryptaspasma lugubris (Felder, 1875)
Cydia ingens (Heinrich, 1926)
Cydia membrosa (Heinrich, 1926)
Epiblema strenuana (Walker, 1863)
Episimus guiana (Busck, 1913)
Episimus transferrana (Walker, 1863)
Gymnandrosoma aurantianum Costa Lima, 1927
Gymnandrosoma leucothorax Adamski & Brown, 2001
Olethreutes subapicana Walker, 1863
Rhopobota cicatrix Razowski, 1999
Rhopobota macroceria Razowski, 1999
Rhopobota microceria Razowski, 1999
Rhopobota unidens Razowski, 1999
Rhyacionia frustrana (Comstock, 1880)
Rhyacionia pallidicosta Razowski, 1999
Strepsicrates smithiana Walsingham, 1891

Tortricinae
Amorbia sp.
Apotoforma monochroma (Walsingham, 1897)
Apotoforma negans (Walsingham, 1897)
Argyrotaenia bisignata Razowski, 1999
Argyrotaenia ceramica Razowski, 1999
Argyrotaenia felisana Razowski, 1999
Argyrotaenia mesosignaria Razowski, 1999
Argyrotaenia minisignaria Razowski, 1999
Argyrotaenia neibana Razowski, 1999
Argyrotaenia nuezana Razowski, 1999
Argyrotaenia ochrochroa Razowski, 1999
Argyrotaenia thamaluncus Razowski, 1999
Bonagota dominicana Razowski, 1999
Claduncaria ochrochlaena (Razowski, 1999)
Cochylis pimana (Busck, 1907)
Coelostathma parallelana Walsingham, 1897
Eugnosta chalicophora Razowski, 1999
Orthocomotis independentia Razowski, 1999
Platynota flavedana Clemens, 1860
Platynota restitutana (Walker, 1863)
Platynota rostrana (Walker, 1863)
Saphenista peraviae Razowski, 1994

Geometroidea

Uraniidae
Manidia excavata (Walker, 1854)

Geometridae

Ennominae
Arilophia rawlinsi Rindge, 1990
Cyclomia mopsaria mopsaria Guenée, 1858
Digrammia heliothidata (Guenée, 1858)
Epimecis detexta Walker, 1860
Epimecis hortaria (Fabricius, 1794)
Epimecis matronaria (Guenée, 1857)
Epimecis scolopaiae scolopaiae Drury, 1773
Epimecis scolopaiae transitaria Walker, 1860
Erastria decrepitaria decrepitaria (Hübner, 1823)
Euchlaena amoenaria astylusaria Walker, 1860
Iridopsis idonearia idonearia (Walker, 1860)
Iridopsis monticola (Rindge, 1966)
Macaria abydata Guenée, 1858
Macaria everiata Guenée, 1858
Macaria inoptata Walker, 1861
Macaria paleolata Guenée, 1858
Microsema immaculata (Warren, 1897)
Nepheloleuca complicata (Guenée, 1858)
Nepheloleuca floridata (Grote, 1883)
Numia terebintharia Guenée, 1858
Oxydia vesulia transponens (Walker, 1860)
Patalene epionata (Guenée, 1858)
Patalene nicoaria (Walker, 1860)
Patalene nutriaria (Walker, 1860)
Pero nerisaria (Walker, 1860)
Pero rica Poole, 1987
Pero sella Poole, 1987
Phrygionis bicornis Scoble, 1994
Phrygionis ferreus Scoble, 1994
Phrygionis rawlinsi Scoble, 1994
Pyrinia fusilineata Walker, 1863
Renia fraternalis (J.B. Smith, 1895)
Sabulodes subopalaria (Walker, 1860)
Semiothisa cosmiata Walker, 1861
Semiothisa increta (Walker, 1861)
Sphacelodes haitiaria Oberthür, 1923
Thysanopyga abdominaria (Guenée, 1858)
Thysanopyga nicetaria (Guenée, 1858)
Thysanopyga proditata (Walker, 1861)

Geometrinae
Synchlora herbaria herbaria (Fabricius, 1794)

Larentiinae
Disclisioprocta stellata (Guenée, 1858)
Euphyia perturbata Walker, 1862
Obila pannosata (Guenée, 1858)
Pterocypha floridata (Walker, 1863)
Triphosa affirmata (Guenée, 1858)
Xanthorhoe divisata (Walker, 1863)

Oenochrominae
Almodes terraria Guenée, 1858

Sterrhinae
Acratodes phakellurata Guenée, 1858
Cyclophora nanaria (Walker, 1861)
Euacidalia externata (Walker, 1863)
Eumacrodes yponomeutaria (Guenée, 1858)
Leptostales noctuata (Guenée, 1858)
Leptostales phorcaria (Guenée, 1858)
Lobocleta dativaria Schaus, 1940
Lobocleta inermaria (Guenée, 1858)
Lobocleta monogrammata (Guenée, 1858)
Lobocleta nymphidiata (Guenée, 1858)
Lobocleta perditaria (Walker, 1866)
Pleuroprucha rudimentaria (Guenée, 1858)
Ptychamalia botydata (Walker, 1861)
Scopula micrata (Guenée, 1858)
Semaeopus castaria (Guenée, 1858)
Semaeopus indignaria indignaria (Guenée, 1858)
Sterrha curvicauda Schaus, 1940

Bombycoidea

Saturniidae

Hemileucinae
Hispaniodirphia lemaireiana Rougerie & Herbin, 2006
Hispaniodirphia plana (Walker, 1855)

Sphingoidea

Sphingidae

Macroglossinae

Dilophonotini
Aellopos tantalus (Linnaeus, 1758)
Callionima calliomenae (Schaufuss, 1870)
Enyo lugubris lugubris (Linnaeus, 1771)
Enyo ocypete (Linnaeus, 1758)
Erinnyis alope alope (Drury, 1770)
Erinnyis crameri (Schaus, 1898)
Erinnyis domingonis (Butler, 1875)
Erinnyis ello ello (Linnaeus, 1758)
Erinnyis guttularis (Walker, 1856)
Erinnyis lassauxii (Boisduval, 1859)
Erinnyis obscura (Fabricius, 1775)
Erinnyis oenotrus (Cramer, 1782)
Isognathus rimosus molitor Rothschild & Jordan, 1915
Pachylia ficus (Linnaeus, 1758)
Pachylia syces insularis (Hübner, 1822)
Pachylioides resumens (Walker, 1856)
Perigonia caryae Cadiou & Rawlins, 1998
Perigonia glaucescens Walker, 1856
Perigonia lefebraei (Lucas, 1846)
Perigonia lusca lusca (Fabricius, 1777)
Perigonia manni Clark, 1935
Phrixus caicus (Cramer, 1777)
Pseudosphinx tetrio (Linnaeus, 1771)

Philampelini
Eumorpha fasciata fasciata (Sulzer, 1776)
Eumorpha labruscae labruscae (Linnaeus, 1758)
Eumorpha strenua (Ménétriès, 1857)
Eumorpha vitis vitis (Linnaeus, 1758)

Macroglossini
Cautethia carsusi Haxaire & Schmitt, 2001
Cautethia grotei grotei H. Edwards, 1882
Cautethia noctuiformis noctuiformis (Walker, 1856)
Hyles lineata lineata (Fabricius, 1775)
Xylophanes chiron necchus (Cramer, 1779)
Xylophanes falco (Walker, 1856)
Xylophanes irrorata (Grote, 1865)
Xylophanes pluto (Fabricius, 1777)
Xylophanes porcus (Hübner, 1823)
Xylophanes rhodocera (Walker, 1856)
Xylophanes tersa tersa (Linnaeus, 1771)

Sphinginae

Sphingini
Agrius cingulatus (Fabricius, 1775)
Amphonyx kofleri Eitschberger, 2006
Amphonyx rivularis Butler, 1875
Cocytius antaeus antaeus (Drury, 1773)
Cocytius duponchel (Poey, 1832)
Manduca afflicta afflicta (Grote, 1865)
Manduca brontes haitiensis (Clark, 1916)
Manduca caribbea (Cary, 1952)
Manduca quinquemaculata (Haworth, 1803)
Manduca rustica dominicana (Gehlen, 1928)
Manduca sexta jamaicensis (Linnaeus, 1764)
Nannoparce poeyi poeyi Grote, 1867
Neococytius cluentius (Cramer, 1775)
Sphinx tricolor Clark, 1923

Smerinthini
Protambulyx strigilis strigilis (Linnaeus, 1771)

Noctuoidea

Notodontidae

Hapigiinae
Antillisa barbuti Thiaucourt, 2006
Antillisa vincenti Thiaucourt, 2006

Hemiceratinae
Hemiceras domingonis Dyar, 1908

Nystaleinae
Hippia vittipalpis (Walker, 1857)
Nystalea ebalea (Cramer, 1779)
Nystalea aequipars Walker, 1858
Nystalea indiana Grote, 1884
Pentobesa smithsoni Weller, 1991
Symmerista albifrons (Smith, 1797)

Erebidae

Arctiinae
Bituryx lanceolata (Walker, 1856)
Calidota strigosa (Walker, 1855)
Caribarctia bertrandae Vincent, 2006
Caribarctia cardinalis Ferguson, 1985
Halysidota ata Watson, 1980
Holomelina semirosea (Druce, 1889)
Hypercompe decora (Walker, 1855)
Pareuchaetes insulata (Walker, 1855)

Ctenuchinae
Ctenucha editha (Walker, 1856)
Clystea rubipectus Schaus, 1898
Empyreuma affinis Rothschild, 1912
Empyreuma lichas (Fabricius, 1781)
Empyreuma pugione (Linnaeus, 1767)
Eunomia columbina (Fabricius, 1793)
Horama panthalon texana (Grote, 1860)
Horama rawlinsi McCabe, 1992
Lymire candida Forbes, 1917
Lymire edwardsi (Grote, 1881)
Napata munda (Walker, 1856)
Nyridela chalciope (Hübner, 1827)
Phoenicoprocta partheni (Fabricius, 1793)

Lithosiinae
Aethosia ectrocta Hampson, 1900
Afrida basiposis Dyar, 1913
Afrida tortricifascies Dyar, 1913
Areva trigemmis (Hübner, 1824–1831)
Boenasa angelica Schaus, 1924
Boenasa nigrorosea Walker, 1865
Mulona lapidaria Walker, 1866
Torycus domingonis Schaus, 1924

Pericopinae
Composia credula (Fabricius, 1775)
Ctenuchidia subcyanea (Walker, 1845)
Hyalurga vinosa (Drury, 1773)
Stenognatha flinti Todd, 1982
Utetheisa bella (Linnaeus, 1758)
Utetheisa ornatrix ornatrix (Linnaeus, 1758)

Phaegopterinae
Lophocampa bahorucoensis Vincent, 2005
Lophocampa caryae (Harris, 1841)
Lophocampa duarteiensis Vincent, 2005
Lophocampa latepunctata Vincent, 2005
Lophocampa lesieuri Vincent, 2005
Lophocampa neibaensis Vincent, 2005

Noctuidae

Acontiinae
Acontia tetragona Walker, 1857
Chobata discalis Walker, 1857
Cobubatha metaspilaris Walker, 1863
Cydosia nobilitella Cramer, 1779
Eublemma recta (Guenée, 1852)
Eublemma rosescens Hampson, 1898
Marimatha trajectalis Walker, 1865
Ponometia exigua (Fabricius, 1793)
Spragueia dama (Guenée, 1852)
Spragueia margana (Fabricius, 1794)
Tarachidia venustula (Walker, 1865)

Agaristinae
Caularis undulans Walker, 1857
Seirocastnia tribuna (Hübner, 1825)

Amphipyrinae
Antachara rotundata Walker, 1858
Callopistria floridensis Guenée, 1852
Catabena vitrina (Walker, 1857)
Condica albigera (Guenée, 1852)
Condica circuita (Guenée, 1852)
Condica concisa (Walker, 1856)
Condica mobilis (Walker, 1856)
Condica punctifera (Walker, 1857)
Condica sufficiens (Walker, 1858)
Condica sutor (Guenée, 1852)
Cropia indigna (Walker, 1857)
Cropia subapicalis (Walker, 1857)
Dypterygia punctirena (Walker, 1857)
Hampsonodes ampliplaga (Walker, 1858)
Micrathetis triplex (Walker, 1857)
Speocropia scriptura (Walker, 1858)

Bagisarinae
Bagisara repanda (Fabricius, 1793)
Bagisara tristicta Hampson, 1898

Catocalinae
Achaea ablunaris (Guenée, 1852)
Alabama argillacea (Hübner, 1823)
Anomis editrix (Guenée, 1852)
Anomis erosa (Hübner, 1821)
Anomis exacta Hübner, 1822
Anomis flava (Fabricius, 1775)
Anomis impasta Guenée, 1852
Anomis luridula Guenée, 1852
Anomis properans (Walker, 1857)
Antapistis leucospila (Walker, 1865)
Antiblemma brevipennis (Walker, 1865)
Antiblemma leucospila (Walker, 1865)
Antiblemma rufinans (Guenée, 1852)
Antiblemma sterope (Walker, 1858)
Anticarsia gemmatalis Hübner, 1818
Ascalapha odorata (Linnaeus, 1758)
Azeta quassa Walker, 1858
Azeta repugnalis Hübner, 1831
Baniana relapsa (Walker, 1858)
Batina marginalis Walker, 1865
Bulia confirmans (Walker, 1857)
Caenurgia adusta (Walker, 1865)
Casandria ferrocana Walker, 1857
Celiptera levina Stoll, 1782
Coenipeta mollis Walker, 1865
Concana mundissima Walker, 1857
Diphthera festiva (Fabricius, 1775)
Elousa albicans Walker, 1857
Ephyrodes cacata Guenée, 1852
Ephyrodes omicron Guenée, 1852
Epidromia pyraliformis (Walker, 1858)
Epidromia valida (Walker, 1865c)
Epitausa laetabilis Walker, 1857
Eudocima serpentifera (Walker, 1857)
Eulepidotis addens (Walker, 1858)
Eulepidotis modestula (Herrich-Schäffer, 1869)
Glympis arenalis (Walker, 1865)
Glympis eubolialis (Walker, 1865)
Gonodonta bidens bidens Geyer, 1832
Gonodonta incurva (Sepp, 1840)
Gonodonta nitidimacula Guenée, 1852
Gonodonta nutrix (Stoll, 1780)
Gonodonta unica Neumoegen, 1891
Gonodonta uxoria (Cramer, 1780)
Hemeroblemma lienaris (Hübner, 1823)
Hemeroblemma numeria (Drury, 1773)
Hemeroblemma rengus (Poey, 1832)
Hemeroplanis aurora (Walker, 1865)
Hemeroplanis scopulepes Haworth, 1809
Hypocala andremona (Stoll, 1781)
Hypogrammodes balma (Guenée, 1852)
Isogona scindens (Walker, 1858)
Kakopoda progenies (Guenée, 1852)
Lesmone formularis (Geyer, 1837)
Letis intracta Walker, 1858
Letis mycerina Cramer, 1777
Litoprosopus haitiensis Hampson, 1926
Litoprosopus hatuey (Poey, 1832)
Litoprosopus puncticosta Hampson, 1926
Massala obvertens (Walker, 1858)
Melipotis acontioides (Guenée, 1852)
Melipotis contorta (Guenée, 1852)
Melipotis famelica (Guenée, 1852)
Melipotis fasciolaris (Hübner, 1825)
Melipotis indomita (Walker, 1857)
Melipotis januaris (Guenée, 1852)
Melipotis jucunda Hübner, 1818
Melipotis lucigera (Walker, 1857)
Melipotis ochrodes (Guenée, 1852)
Melipotis perpendicularis (Guenée, 1852)
Melipotis strigifera (Walker, 1857)
Metallata absumens (Walker, 1862)
Metria irresoluta (Walker, 1858)
Mocis diffluens (Guenée, 1852)
Mocis disseverans (Walker, 1858)
Mocis exscindens (Walker, 1858)
Mocis latipes (Guenée, 1852)
Mocis repanda (Fabricius, 1794)
Ophisma tropicalis Guenée, 1852
Ophiusa salmus Guenée, 1852
Oraesia basiplaga (Walker, 1865)
Oraesia excitans Walker, 1857
Oraesia honesta Walker, 1857
Panula inconstans (Guenée, 1852)
Pararcte immanis (Walker, 1858b)
Perasia flexa (Guenée, 1852)
Perasia garnoti (Guenée, 1852)
Perasia inficita (Walker, 1865)
Plusiodonta stimulans (Walker, 1857)
Ptichodis immunis (Guenée, 1852)
Ptichodis infecta (Walker, 1858)
Radara nealcesalis (Walker, 1859)
Radara tauralis (Walker, 1865)
Renodes aequalis (Walker, 1865)
Renodes eupithecioides (Walker, 1858)
Syllectra ericata (Cramer, 1780)
Syllectra congemmalis Hübner, 1823
Thysania zenobia (Cramer, 1777)
Toxonprucha diffundens (Walker, 1858)
Toxonprucha excavata (Walker, 1865)
Trigonodes lucassi Guenée, 1852
Tyrissa recurva Walker, 1866
Zale albidula (Walker, 1865)
Zale fictilis Guenée, 1852
Zale fuliginosa (Walker, 1857)
Zale peruncta (Guenée, 1852)

Chloephorinae
Collomena filifera (Walker, 1857)

Euteliinae
Eutelia furcata (Walker, 1865)
Paectes arcigera (Guenée, 1852)

Glottulinae
Xanthopastis timais (Cramer, 1782)

Hadeninae
Elaphria cuprescens (Hampson, 1909)
Elaphria deliriosa (Walker, 1857a)
Elaphria nucicolora (Guenée, 1852)
Lacinipolia distributa (Möschler, 1886)
Leucania chejela (Schaus, 1921)
Leucania clarescens Möschler, 1856
Leucania humidicola Guenée, 1852
Leucania dorsalis Walker, 1856
Leucania incognita (Barnes & McDunnough, 1918)
Leucania inconspicua Herrich-Schäffer, 1868
Leucania lamisma Adams, 2001
Leucania latiuscula Herrich-Schäffer, 1868
Leucania lobrega Adams, 2001
Leucania neiba Adams, 2001
Leucania rawlinsi Adams, 2001
Leucania sonroja Adams, 2001
Leucania senescens Möschler, 1890
Mythimna unipuncta (Haworth, 1809)
Spodoptera albula (Walker, 1857)
Spodoptera dolichos (Fabricius, 1794)
Spodoptera eridania (Cramer, 1782)
Spodoptera exigua (Hübner, 1808)
Spodoptera frugiperda (J. E. Smith, 1797)
Spodoptera latisfacia (Walker, 1856)
Spodoptera ornithogalli (Guenée, 1852)
Spodoptera pulchella (Herrich-Schäffer, 1868)

Heliothinae
Helicoverpa zea (Boddie, 1850)
Heliothis lucilinea (Walker, 1858)
Heliothis subflexa (Guenée, 1852)
Heliothis virescens (Fabricius, 1777)

Herminiinae
Bleptina acastusalis Walker, 1858
Bleptina atymnusalis (Walker, 1858)
Bleptina caradrinalis Guenée, 1854
Bleptina hydrillalis Guenée, 1854
Bleptina menalcasalis Walker, 1858
Bleptina pithosalis Walker, 1858
Heterogramma micculalis Guenée, 1854
Hypenula complectalis (Guenée, 1854)
Lophophora thaumasalis (Walker, 1858)
Mursa phthisialis (Guenée, 1854)
Mursa sotiusalis (Walker, 1859)
Salia ferrigeralis (Walker, 1865)

Hypeninae
Hypena concinnulalis Walker, 1865
Hypena lividalis (Hübner, 1796)
Hypena pacatalis Walker, 1858
Hypena subidalis Guenée, 1854
Hypena vetustalis Guenée, 1852

Noctuinae
Agrotis apicalis (Herrich-Schäffer, 1868)
Agrotis subterranea (Fabricius, 1794)
Agrotis ipsilon (Hufnagel, 1766)
Anicla infecta (Ochsenheimer, 1816)
Feltia jaculifera (Guenée, 1852)

Nolinae
Nola cereella (Bosc, 1800)

Plusiinae
Argyrogramma verruca (Fabricius, 1794)
Autoplusia egena (Guenée, 1852)
Mouralia tinctoides (Guenée, 1852)
Plusia calceolaris Walker, 1857
Pseudoplusia includens (Walker, 1857)
Trichoplusia ni (Hübner, 1803)

Sarrothripinae
Characoma sp.
Iscadia aperta Walker, 1857

Unplaced to subfamily
Homoptera terminalis Walker, 1857
Magusa orbifera (Walker, 1857a)
Notioplusia illustrata (Guenée, 1852)
Poaphila scita Walker, 1865
Phurys contenta Walker, 1865
Phurys pura Walker, 1865
Selenisa humeralis (Walker, 1857)
Selenisa projiciens (Hampson, 1826)

References

Lepidoptera
Lepidoptera
Hispaniola
Hispaniola
Hispaniola
Hispaniola
Hispaniola
Hispaniola
Lepidoptera
Lepidoptera
Natural history of Hispaniola